Santiago Herrera Yallonardo (born 27 November 1999) is a Venezuelan footballer who plays as a forward for Monagas S.C. in the Venezuelan Primera Division. Prior to joining the club, Herrera played the 2022 season with Deportivo La Guaira F.C. Herrera played collegiately in the United States for the North Carolina Tar Heels of the University of North Carolina at Chapel Hill from 2019-2021. He played for the UCLA Bruins for 2017-18.

Herrera signed with Deportivo La Guaira in February 2022, making his league debut on 24 February 2022. In his first season with the club, Hererra registered five goals in 26 league appearances as Los Naranjas finished the regular season in fifth place in the standings. Herrera appeared in five matches in the Copa Sudamericana tournament, failing to score in 337 minutes of action.

In January 2023, Herrera signed a two-year contract with Monagas S.C. Herrera debuted for Monagas on 4 Feb 2023 against his former club, Deportivo La Guaira, logging 20 minutes as a substitute in a scoreless draw. On 12 Feb 2023, Herrera registered his first assist for Monagas in a 3-1 win over A.C.C.D. Mineros de Guayana, playing just 7 minutes as a late-game substitute. Herrera scored his first goal for Monagas on 25 Feb 2023, the match winner, in a 1-0 victory against Angostura F.C.

Career statistics

Club

Notes

References

1999 births
Living people
Venezuelan footballers
Venezuela under-20 international footballers
Venezuelan expatriate footballers
Association football forwards
Asociación Civil Deportivo Lara players
Venezuelan expatriate sportspeople in the United States
Expatriate soccer players in the United States
North Carolina Tar Heels men's soccer players
UCLA Bruins men's soccer players
Venezuelan Primera División players
Sportspeople from Barquisimeto